Robert Dover is a member of the Nebraska Legislature from Norfolk, Nebraska in District 19 who was appointed by Governor Pete Ricketts on July 22, 2022, to fill the seat of former Senator Mike Flood who resigned after being elected to the United States House of Representatives.

References

Republican Party Nebraska state senators
21st-century American politicians
Living people
Year of birth missing (living people)